Lusanga Airport  was a former airstrip that served the town of Lusanga in Kwilu Province, Democratic Republic of the Congo.

The grass runway has trees growing midfield and is unusable.

See also

 List of airports in the Democratic Republic of the Congo

References

 Lusanga Airport
 Great Circle Mapper - Lusanga

External links
 HERE Maps - Lusanga
 OpenStreetMap - Lusanga
 OurAirports - Lusanga

Defunct airports
Airports in Kwilu Province